Otis Harris Jr. (born June 30, 1982, in Edwards, Mississippi) is an American track and field athlete. He won the silver medal in the 400 meters at the 2004 Summer Olympics.

Harris attended Hinds Agricultural High School in Utica, Mississippi, and collected several honors during his high school career, being named first team All-American just being one of them. He twice won the 400 meters in the junior Olympics and led his team to three state championships. In 2000 he enrolled at the University of South Carolina. As a Gamecock, he was a member of their 2002 NCAA championship 4x400m relay team and finished as the runner-up in the 400 m in 2003.

At the 2004 Summer Olympics Harris won the silver medal in the 400 meters. He came in second in both of his qualifying runs before placing second to fellow US team member Jeremy Wariner in the final. Derrick Brew came in third and all three athletes together with Darold Williamson won a gold medal in the 4x400 m relay for the United States. One month later Harris finished third at the World Athletics Final.

Harris trains with his college coach Curtis Frye in Columbia, South Carolina. He has not run under 45 seconds since 2004, nor has he competed in a major international championship.

References
 
 Otis Harris' biography at uscsports.com
 Otis Harris' U.S. Olympic Team bio

1982 births
Living people
People from Edwards, Mississippi
American male sprinters
Athletes (track and field) at the 2004 Summer Olympics
Olympic gold medalists for the United States in track and field
Olympic silver medalists for the United States in track and field
South Carolina Gamecocks men's track and field athletes
Track and field athletes from Mississippi
African-American male track and field athletes
Medalists at the 2004 Summer Olympics
21st-century African-American sportspeople
20th-century African-American people